The 2000 Indiana gubernatorial election was held on November 7, 2000. Incumbent Governor Frank O'Bannon, a Democrat, was re-elected over Republican David M. McIntosh with 57% of the vote. Libertarian Andrew Horning also ran and received 2% of the vote. O'Bannon's victory was the fourth consecutive election in which a Democrat was elected Governor of Indiana, the longest winning streak for that party in the state since the Civil War. , this was the last time a Democrat was elected Governor of Indiana.

Primaries

Republican
Congressman David M. McIntosh faced John Price in the May 2 Primary Election. Former gubernatorial candidate George Witwer had previously declined to run and instead endorsed McIntosh. McIntosh's central campaign theme was a 25% cut in property taxes, which drew ire from many of his opponents. McIntosh also called for replacing the ISTEP Plus standardized test and merit-based evaluations of teachers in his "Kids First" education plan, released on March 3, 2000.

Price's campaign was based largely on his "Price Plan", a 70-page booklet outlining a 27-step program for running the state government. In the Primary election, Price was defeated soundly by McIntosh, who won 71% of the vote.

Democratic
Incumbent Governor Frank O'Bannon ran unopposed for his party's nomination. He won 272,213 votes statewide and 100% of the vote.

Other Candidates
Libertarian Andrew Horning entered the gubernatorial race on March 23, pledging to eliminate state property taxes. Horning had run for Mayor of Indianapolis in 1999 and received four percent of the vote. Horning pitched himself as an alternative to the two major parties, both of which he blamed for "the embarrassing state of education in Indiana".

Horning's running mate was Mark Schreiber.

General election

Campaign
Throughout the campaign, McIntosh made his proposed 25% tax cut his signature issue. O'Bannon attacked the plan as potentially harmful to education, which was his top talking point during the fall campaign. O'Bannon unveiled a $310 million education plan on July 19 which drew scorn from both sides because of the inclusion of lottery money in the proposed funding. Despite this, O'Bannon maintained a steady lead over his opponent, with a September 1 poll showing him leading McIntosh by 21 points. This was partially credited to public distrust of McIntosh's tax policies, with polls showing "deep skepticism" of the proposed 25% cut, according to the Indianapolis Star.

Results
O'Bannon won the election with 57% of the vote. McIntosh trailed far behind at 42%, with Horning carrying just 2% of the vote.

References

Gubernatorial
2000
Indiana